Towie may refer to:

 Towie, Aberdeenshire
 Towie Barclay Castle, Aberdeenshire
 Towie Castle, Kildrummy, Aberdeenshire
 Towie (game), a three-hand variant of Bridge
 The Only Way Is Essex, a British reality television series

See also

Tonie